Highland barley, Tibetan barley or Himalayan barley (Tibetan: ནས་; Wylie: nas;; qīngkē, or 藏青稞; zàng qīngkē) is the principal cereal cultivated on the Tibetan Plateau, used mainly to make tsampa and liquor (chang).

Today, it is used to make beer (Lhasa Beer), flour, bread, cakes or noodles.

Three Chinese words are associated with two varieties of barley:
  and : Hordeum aegiceras Nees ex Royle
 : Hordeum distichon L.

Gallery

References 

Barley cultivars